Dungannon Tigers Football Club is an intermediate-level football club playing in the Intermediate B division of the Mid-Ulster Football League in Northern Ireland. They play all home games at the Joe McAree Stadium, Dungannon.

References
Role of honour 
2004 - Cookstown Street League Winners

2006 - Lonsdale League Champions

2007- mid ulster div 4 runners up

2008 - Beckett cup Winners

2009 - Mufl div 3 Champions

2010 - Mulf div 2 champions

2010 - Foster cup winners

2013- Marshall cup runners up

2014 - intermediate B  cup winners

References

Mid-Ulster Football League clubs